The Salvadoran Air Force (abbreviated FAS) is the air force branch of the Armed Forces of El Salvador.

Early history
The Salvadoran Army Air Force (abbreviated FAS) was formed on 20 March 1923 during a period of heavy interest in aviation in El Salvador. In 1947, after signing the treaty of Rio (which was a mutual defense treaty among the states of America including the U.S.), El Salvador gained a new US air mission and the United States increased transfers of aircraft to the nation.

Recent operations

The Salvadoran Air Force first saw action in the 1969 Football War against Honduras equipped with F4U Corsairs and P-51 Mustangs. From the late 1970s, isolated guerilla actions rapidly developed into a civil war. US aid to El Salvador in 1980 consisted of six UH-1Hs and four in 1981; they were used as gunships. Other deliveries brought that number of UH-1Hs in service up to 40. In February 1982 onwards the United States delivered eight A-37B Dragonflies, 12 UH-1Hs, four O-2As and three C-123Ks. On 6 May 2013, in celebration of the 189th anniversary of the Armed Forces of El Salvador, the Salvadoran Government announced the planned purchase of 10 A-37 aircraft from Chile.

A four-engined Douglas DC-6B provided long-range logistical capability between 1975 and its retirement in 1998. It was used on supply flights to and from the United States. In December 1984, two AC-47s were delivered to be in service with the other three C-47s in use. The civil war ended in mutual exhaustion in 1990 and the Air Force was geared for internal security.

In September 2016 it was reported that the Salvadoran Air Force in cooperation with the Colombian Air Force was finalizing negotiations on modernizing The Bell UH-1H helicopters to the Huey 2 standard.

Aircraft

Current inventory

Retired aircraft 
Some notable aircraft, previous operated by the Air Force were the Dassault Ouragan, CM.170 Magister, Cessna O-2 Skymaster, Douglas AC-47, SOCATA R235 Guerrier, and the Hughes 300C.

References

Bibliography
 Eastwood A.B. and Roach J.R., Piston Engined Airliner Production List, 2007, The Aviation Hobby Shop
World Aircraft information files Brightstar publishing London File 342 sheet 2

External links 
http://www.aeroflight.co.uk/waf/americas/el_salvador/El_Salvador-af-EscCazaBomb.htm
http://www.armyrecognition.com/Amerique_du_nord/El_Salvadore/El-Salvadore_index_equipement.htm
http://www.acig.org/artman/publish/article_158.shtml
http://flotilla-aerea.com/
https://web.archive.org/web/20190318183227/http://www.fas.gob.sv/

Military of El Salvador
El Salvador